Saltuarius moritzi, also known commonly as the New England leaf-tailed gecko or Moritz's leaf-tailed gecko, is a species of lizard in the family Carphodactylidae. The species is native to Australia.

Etymology
The specific name, moritzi, is in honor of Australian herpetologist Craig Moritz.

Geographic range
S. moritzi is endemic to the New England Tablelands in New South Wales.

Habitat
The preferred habitats of S. moritzi are closed forests, wet sclerophyll forests, and rocky escarpments, gorges, and outcrops.

Description

Reproduction
S. moritzi is oviparous.

References

Further reading
Cogger HG (2014). Reptiles and Amphibians of Australia, Seventh Edition. Clayton, Victoria, Australia: CSIRO Publishing. xxx + 1,033 pp. .
Couper, Patrick J.; Sadlier, Ross A.; Shea, Glenn M.; Worthington Wilmer, Jessica (2009). "A Reassessment of Saltuarius swaini (Lacertilia: Diplodactylidae) in Southeastern Queensland and New South Wales; Two New Taxa, Phylogeny, Biogeography and Conservation". Records of the Australian Museum 60 (1): 87–118. (Saltuarius moritzi, new species, pp. 99–105, Figures 12A, 12B, 12C).
Wilson, Steve; Swan, Gerry (2013). A Complete Guide to Reptiles of Australia, Fourth Edition. Sydney: New Holland Publishers. 522 pp. .

Saltuarius
Geckos of Australia
Endemic fauna of Australia
Reptiles described in 2008
Taxa named by Patrick J. Couper
Taxa named by Ross Allen Sadlier
Taxa named by Glenn Michael Shea
Taxa named by Jessica Worthington Wilmer